The Banu Awf was one of the Jewish tribes of Arabia during Muhammad's era.

The Banu Awf was an Arab tribe who wished to settle in the Jewish-ruled Tayma. The local people in Tayma insisted as a condition of settling in Tayma, Banu Awf must adopt Judaism. After having done so, they moved on to Yathrib.

They were included in Point 25 of the Constitution of Medina as allies to the Muslims, being as "one nation", but retaining their Jewish religion.

References

Jewish tribes of Arabia
Muhammad and Judaism